Île-de-France tramway Line 1 (usually called simply T1) is part of the modern tram network of the Île-de-France region of France. Line T1 connects Noisy-le-Sec station and Asnières-sur-Seine with a suburban alignment running in parallel to the Northern city limits of Paris. It opened in 1992 as the first modern tram line in the Paris region. The line was extended in December 2003 and November 2012.

Line T1 is operated by the Régie autonome des transports parisiens (RATP) under the authority of Île-de-France Mobilités. Daily ridership reaches 188,000 passengers (in 2015) making it the second busiest line of the tram network.

A 1-stop extension to the west towards Quatre Routes opened to the public in mid-2019. A further extension to the west towards Colombes (which would allow for a transfer with Line T2) is currently at the planning stage. To the east a planned extension towards Val de Fontenay, which has been blocked for several years due to strong opposition from the municipality of Noisy-le-Sec, will finally be constructed in two stages with the first phase connecting Noisy-le-Sec station to Montreuil (Rue de Rosny) only.

History

Timeline

 6 July 1992: Start of service between Bobigny-Pablo Picasso and La Courneuve-8 Mai 1945
 15 December 1992: Extension towards the west from La Courneuve–8 Mai 1945 to Saint-Denis station
 15 December 2003: Extension towards the east from Bobigny-Pablo Picasso to Gare de Noisy-le-Sec
 15 November 2012: Extension towards the west from Saint-Denis station to Les Courtilles
 12 October 2019: Extension towards the west from Les Courtilles to Asnières-Quarte Routes

Rebirth of the tramway
Île-de-France tramway Line 1 marked the return to this type of transportation, having been absent in the region since 1957, and was the result of a long battle between the Seine-Saint-Denis General Council and the towns through which it would pass. In July 1976, the schéma directeur d'aménagement et d'urbanisme de la région parisienne ("Organizing Plan for the Development and Urbanism of the Region of Paris") caused the creation of ring roads to the north and south of the agglomeration to facilitate links between different suburbs for which there was a constantly increasing demand. A schéma directeur des sites propres ("Directing plan for dedicated lines") was created by the RATP in response to a request from the direction régionale de l'Équipement d'Île-de-France ("Regional direction for equipment of Î-d-F"). It notably discussed the issue of traffic congestion on Route nationale 186 (N186) which would be greatly relieved by the creation of the A86 autoroute.

In 1977, the Institut d'aménagement et d'urbanisme de la région d'Île-de-France ("Institute for the Management and Urbanism of the Île-de-France Region"; IAURIF) was given a mission by the direction régionale de l'Équipement to study the creation of two structural ring roads in the suburbs, one of which was to connect the business district of La Défense in the west to the capital of Seine-Saint-Denis, Bobigny, in the east. The Institute proposed that they use a tramway, which has a greater capacity than the bus and has numerous other advantages such as less noise, no pollution, adaptability to future traffic situation and accessibility for the disabled due to its lower platform. The tramway seemed to be the perfect solution for suburb-to-suburb connections since the lower ridership could never justify creating a metro line but was too high for a simple bus line.

In 1980, the IAURIF studied more specifically the connection between Saint-Denis and Bobigny, the first section of the ring in partnership with the RATP which still had some reservations about using this mode of transportation since the expected ridership seemed like it might not be sufficient to ensure the profitability of a tramway. The Seine-Saint-Denis General Council argued strongly in favour of the project especially since the national political shift towards the Left in May 1981 favoured such an outcome.

In 1982, the RATP, in cooperation with the direction départementale de l'Équipement of Seine-Saint-Denis, commissioned a preliminary feasibility study on a tramway project which would primarily serve the nearby suburban areas that were mostly populated but were affected by deindustrialization and population decline. The proposed route had connections with three metro lines and one train station, which made it more attractive in combining the ring road service with being a feeder for the radial lines from downtown Paris. The first version of the proposal was presented in March to April 1983. The IAURIF boasted its commitment to "intermediate solutions between heavy rail systems and bus networks, victims of overcrowding." Nonetheless, the institute left the choice of mode of transportation on the table, only indicating its preference for electrically powered transportation which effectively meant a choice between the tramway and the trolleybus.

A comparison was then given between three different solutions: a tramway, an articulated bus and an articulated trolleybus. The study showed that the installation of a tramway would initially cost the most, but its operational cost per passenger would be lower after the first year and would attract more passengers. The balance sheet would be positive for this mode of transportation in less than 12 months of operation. The proposal highlighted the attractiveness of the modern tramway to the public. Its effect on urban planning was equally demonstrated with the rehabilitation of the neighbourhoods it served and reduced usage of the highways. On 28 October 1983 the proposal was approved by the conseil d'administration of the RATP. It was cosigned by the RATP and the DDE 93 in April 1984 and was also approved by the STIF. The project was thus included in regional planning.

The cost of building the infrastructure was estimated on 1 January 1983 to be 470 million francs (about 71.65 million euro or 93.5 million US dollars) and the cost of the train equipment to be 135 million francs (about 20.58 million euro or 26.87 million US dollars). The proposed tramway line had transfer points with line 5 of the Paris metro at Bobigny–Pablo Picasso station, with line 7 (via a May 1987 extension) at La Courneuve-8 Mai 1945, with line 13 at Basilique de Saint-Denis (with a walking transfer) and with RER line D at Saint-Denis railway station. It was greatly influenced by the Tramway Français Standard of Nantes which had been very successful.

Funding was provided with the regional planning contract of 1984. The project, re-estimated to cost 520 million francs (about 79.3 million euro or 103.5 million US dollars), received 50% of its funding from the state, 42.8% from the region and 7.2% from the département, the latter covering the extra cost of building a tramway over other transportation options. The public consultation took place in July 1984 and in August the result was response was published as being favourable. The RATP became in charge of operating the new line and it was declared to be a public utility on 19 December 1984. Construction was estimated to be completed in 1988. Ultimately responsibility for the project was adopted by the STIF with some minor modifications in October 1985, resulting in a final price tag of 535 million francs before tax (about 81.56 million euro or 106.48 million US dollars). With these final modifications, the line was aimed towards the commune of L'Île-Saint-Denis. The line would have to cross the commune but opposition at the time from the Hauts-de-Seine General Council caused the line to end at Saint-Denis railway station.

Political shifts and re-evaluation of the project

The March 1986 legislative elections put the Right in power and combined the politics of the State and the regions. The conservative agenda of the new government put the project in great danger due to their tendency to reduce public spending. The tramway once again caused a debate over its real efficiency. The RATP once again commissioned studies for the government and sent its report to Minister of Transportation Jacques Douffiagues in June 1987. It concluded that it would be possible to replace the tramway with a dedicated bus lane, but this method presented three problems: lower performance in terms of speed and frequency, restarting the whole bureaucratic process over again (which would result in great delays), and finally if the local governments disagreed it could mean they would have to look for new funding.

Route

Notes

References

External links

Railway lines opened in 1992
Line 1
1992 establishments in France